Phylloporus catenulatus is a species of the fungal family Boletaceae. It was first described as a new species in 2017 from Bangladesh. This fungus is putatively associated with Shorea robusta.

References

External links

catenulatus
Fungi of Bangladesh